Manjhanpur is a constituency of the Uttar Pradesh Legislative Assembly covering the city of Manjhanpur in the Kaushambi district of Uttar Pradesh, India.

Manjhanpur is one of five assembly constituencies in the Kaushambi Lok Sabha constituency. Since 2008, this assembly constituency is numbered 252 amongst 403 constituencies.

This seat belonged to Bharatiya Janta Party candidate Lal Bahadur who won in last Assembly election of 2017 Uttar Pradesh Legislative Elections defeating Bahujan Samaj Party candidate Indrajeet Saroz
by a margin of 4,160 votes.

Election results

2022

References

External links
 

Assembly constituencies of Uttar Pradesh
Kaushambi district